Pisuninskaya is a rural locality (a village) in Nizhne-Vazhskoye Rural Settlement, Verkhovazhsky District, Vologda Oblast, Russia. The population was 11 as of 2002.

Geography 
Pisuninskaya is located 14 km southeast of Verkhovazhye (the district's administrative centre) by road. Lymzino is the nearest rural locality.

References 

Rural localities in Verkhovazhsky District